During the 2014–15 season, Red Star competed in the Serbian SuperLiga and the Serbian Cup.

Competitions

Overall

Serbian Cup

Red Star will participate in the 9th Serbian Cup starting in First Round.

Matches

Serbian SuperLiga

The 2014–15 season is Red Star's 9th season in Serbian SuperLiga.

Matches

League table

Results and positions by round

Serbian football clubs 2014–15 season
Red Star Belgrade seasons